Luka Božić (born April 29, 1996) is a Croatian professional basketball player for Zadar of the Croatian League and the ABA League. Standing at 2.00 m, he plays at the small forward positions.

Playing career 
A native of Bjelovar, Croatia, Božić played in the second tier of Croatian basketball for KK Bjelovar until he was picked up by KK Zagreb, a member of the country's top-flight A-1 Liga, in 2014. He immediately established himself as a scoring threat, averaging 15.1 points a game in the 2014-15 campaign. In the 2015–16 season, Božić increased his scoring output to 17.3 points per contest, draining 48.4 percent of his shots taken (177-366) including 38.4 percent (61-159) from three-point range. In 2016–17, he emerged as the second-leading scorer of the A1 league, compiling averages of 22.2 points, 6.8 rebounds and 6.0 assists in 24 A1 contests, shooting 57.6 percent from inside the arc and 31.5 percent from three-point territory.

In April 2017, Božić entered his name for the 2017 NBA Draft. At the end of the June 12 NBA Draft deadline, he would be only one of 10 international underclassmen to officially hold his name for the NBA Draft that year. However, he was not drafted.

In September 2017 he signed a two-year contract with Zadar. In July 2021, he sighed with Široki.

In August 2022, Bozić returned to Zadar signing a short-term contract with a possibility of renewal.

National team career 
He was part of the Croatia youth selections at the 2012 FIBA Europe Under-16 Championship, at the 2014 FIBA Europe Under-18 Championship taking the bronze medal, at the 2015 FIBA Under-19 World Championship taking the silver, the 2015 FIBA Europe Under-20 Championship and the 2016 FIBA Europe Under-20 Championship Division B.

References

External links and sources 
 FIBA.com profile

1996 births
Living people
ABA League players
Croatian men's basketball players
KK Budućnost players
KK Zadar players
KK Zagreb players
HKK Široki players
Shooting guards
Small forwards
Sportspeople from Bjelovar